Tuija I. Pulkkinen (born 1962) is a Finnish space physicist. Her primary research foci are studying 
the energy flow from the solar wind to the near-Earth space environment and the 
energy dissipation processes in the magnetosphere.

Early life and education 
Pulkkinen was born in 1962. She received M.S. and Ph.D. degrees in theoretical physics from the
University of Helsinki in 1987 and 1992.

Research and career
Pulkkinen's main research contributions are related to modelling current in the magnetotail during the growth of storms and 
understanding its importance for magnetotail instabilities. She has broad experience in both modeling and data analysis.

Pulkkinen received the American Geophysical Union Macelwane Medal in 1998 for outstanding research by a young scientist.

Pulkkinen was affiliated with the Finnish Meteorological Institute from 1998 to 2010. In 2011 she became Dean of the School of Electrical Engineering at Aalto University; she was vice president for Research at the same institution for 2014–2018. She became chair of the Department of Climate and Space Sciences and Engineering at the University of Michigan in 2018.

Awards and honors
 1988: Macelwane Medal, American Geophysical Union
 2001: Member of the Finnish Academy of Science and Letters
 2010: Member of the Finnish Society of Sciences and Letters
 2014: Foreign Member, U.S. National Academy of Sciences
 2017: Julius Bartels Medal, European Geosciences Union

References 

1962 births
Living people
University of Helsinki alumni
Academic staff of Aalto University
University of Michigan faculty
Space scientists
Women space scientists
Finnish women scientists
Foreign associates of the National Academy of Sciences
Members of the Finnish Academy of Science and Letters
20th-century American women scientists
21st-century American women scientists
20th-century Finnish physicists
21st-century Finnish physicists
Women physicists
Expatriate academics in the United States